Harrah's Council Bluffs is a hotel and casino located in Council Bluffs, Iowa across the Missouri River from Omaha, Nebraska. It is owned by Vici Properties and operated by Caesars Entertainment. Harrah's Council Bluffs has many amenities including a 251-room hotel, 2 restaurants and 2 bars.

Harrah's Council Bluffs is one of three casinos in the city of Council Bluffs including Horseshoe Council Bluffs and Ameristar Casino Council Bluffs.

On October 6, 2017, ownership of the property was transferred to Vici Properties as part of a corporate spin-off, and it was leased back to Caesars Entertainment.

History
Harrah's began as Harvey's having opened in 1996 with the Kanesville Queen riverboat, a three-story floating casino.  Harrah's later acquired Harvey's in 2001.  In 2007, Iowa law allowed casino operators to move to on shore operations.  Maintenance costs for the riverboat were high, with Harrah's claiming to have spent over $400,000, to dredge around the boat annually.  In 2013, Harrah's scrapped the riverboat, which was inconvenient to customers due to its 300-foot ramp entrance.  They moved casino operations to the former convention center into a 25,000 square foot facility with room for 600 slot machines.  Convention operations were moved off site to Horseshoe at the Mid-America Center

References

External links
 

1996 establishments in Iowa
Buildings and structures completed in 1996
Buildings and structures in Council Bluffs, Iowa
Caesars Entertainment
Casino hotels
Casinos completed in 1996
Casinos in Iowa
Hotel buildings completed in 1996
Hotels established in 1996
Hotels in Iowa
Music venues in Iowa
Riverboat casinos
Tourist attractions in Pottawattamie County, Iowa